Willi Sippel (born 20 March 1929) is a German former footballer who played for 1. FC Nürnberg, Borussia Neunkirchen and the Saarland national team as a defender.

References

1929 births
Living people
German footballers
Saar footballers
Saarland international footballers
1. FC Nürnberg players
Borussia Neunkirchen players
Association football defenders